James Martin House may refer to:

James Martin House (Florence, Alabama), listed on the National Register of Historic Places (NRHP) in Lauderdale County
James G. Martin House, Nicholasville, Kentucky, listed on the NRHP in Jessamine County
James Martin House (Snow Hill, Maryland), listed on the NRHP
James Martin House (Walland, Tennessee), listed on the NRHP in Blount County

See also
Martin House (disambiguation)
James Martin (disambiguation)

Architectural disambiguation pages